Zalospirone (WY-47,846) is a selective 5-HT1A partial agonist of the azapirone chemical class. It was found to be effective in the treatment of anxiety and depression in clinical trials, but a high proportion of subjects dropped out due to side effects and development was subsequently never completed.

See also 
 Azapirone

References 

Piperazines
Aminopyrimidines
Imides
Azapirones
Cyclobutenes